Mark Edward Hay (born May 3, 1952) is an American marine ecologist. He is Regents Professor and Harry and Linda Teasley Chair in the School of Biological Sciences at the Georgia Institute of Technology. A fellow of the American Association for the Advancement of Science, he is known for his research on the coral reefs of Fiji. He received the Cody Award from the Scripps Institution of Oceanography in 2012, the Lowell Thomas Award from the Explorers Club in 2015, and the Gilbert Morgan Smith Medal from the National Academy of Sciences in 2018.
He was elected a member of the National Academy of Sciences in 2022.

References

External links
Faculty profile

American ecologists
Living people
Georgia Tech faculty
American marine biologists
Fellows of the American Association for the Advancement of Science
University of California, Irvine alumni
1952 births
University of Kentucky alumni
Chemical ecologists
Members of the United States National Academy of Sciences